Josef Feid, an Austrian landscape painter, was born at Vienna in 1806. He possessed a great talent in depicting foliage and forest life, and died at Weidling, near Vienna, in 1870. The following works by him are in the Vienna Gallery:

A Scene in a Wood, with Nymphs bathing. 1828.
A Study of the Schneeberg.
A Forest Landscape, with a large Oak. 1841.
A Landscape with an approaching Storm.

References

See also
Austrian Painters

1807 births
1870 deaths
Austrian landscape painters
Artists from Vienna
19th-century Austrian painters
19th-century Austrian male artists
Austrian male painters